Ronald Stephen Baron (born 1943) (also known as Ron Baron) is an American mutual fund manager and investor. He is the founder of Baron Capital, an investment management firm.  The New York City based firm manages the Baron Funds, which he also founded, and has approximately $45 billion in assets under management.

As of November 2022, Baron had a net worth of US$5 billion.

Early life and education
Baron grew up in a Jewish family in Asbury Park, New Jersey, one of two children of Morton Baron, an engineer, and his wife Marian. Baron invested $1,000, saved from shoveling snow, waiting tables, working as a life guard, and selling ice cream, and turned it into $4,000 by investing in stocks, prompting cohorts to call him "Count", a nickname which still sticks. He studied chemistry at Bucknell University and attended George Washington University Law School at night on scholarship.  His first job out of school was with the United States Patent Office.

Career
Baron worked for several brokerage firms from 1970 to 1982.  During this time, he developed a reputation for investing in small companies.

Baron Capital Management
He founded Baron Capital Management in 1982. Baron Capital is well known for its long-term strategy in growth equity investments. The firm will typically hold a stock for 4–5 years, sometimes as many as 10–15 years. The firm prefers to invest in mega-trends driven by broad societal and demographic trends, including baby boomer demands for healthcare - trends where demand is expected to remain steady for years, or even decades. The firm seeks to invest in companies that have strong management teams, investing in people not assets. They look for companies that have strong growth opportunities, are appropriately financed, have competitive advantages, and are a leader in their field. Baron Capital places a unique focus on the strength of the management teams of the companies they invest in, looking for credible, dependable, trustworthy leadership. In 2011, Baron Capital had approximately $19.5 billion in assets under management. In an effort to thank investors, Baron hosts an annual shareholder meeting which typically features rock acts such as Elton John, the Beach Boys, and Lionel Richie. In 2012, Baron Capital purchased 24 percent of the stock of the Manchester United Football Club that was offered on the New York Stock Exchange by the Glazer family. Baron's investment amounts to a 5.8% ownership interest in the club as only 10% of the team's stock was floated.
In September 2014, Baron Capital raised its stake in the club to 9.2% of the entire club (equivalent to 37.8% of all shares available on the NYSE.

Personal
In 1978, Baron married Judy Bernard in a Jewish ceremony at the Harmonie Club. In 2007, he paid $103 million for a house in East Hampton, New York, the most ever paid for a residential property at that time, from Adelaide de Menil, heiress to the Schlumberger fortune. De Menil's house had been built by piecing together historic East Hampton buildings that she moved to the property to protect them from demolition. Prior to the close of the sale, de Menil broke up the structures and moved them to various locations in the town for protection, including six that were moved a mile north to where they will form the new campus of the East Hampton Town government. Baron built a new  house, designed by Hart Howerton, a New York architectural firm with several other projects in the Hamptons, which specializes in large-scale land use. The house was included in a 2008 Vanity Fair article.

See also
 List of Ron Baron Investment Conference Entertainment

References

External links
Baronfunds.com

1943 births
Living people
American billionaires
American investors
20th-century American Jews
American money managers
American stock traders
Bucknell University alumni
Businesspeople from New Jersey
Businesspeople from New York (state)
George Washington University Law School alumni
People from Asbury Park, New Jersey
People from East Hampton (town), New York
Stock and commodity market managers
21st-century American Jews